Masjid-e-Anwari is a mosque situated in the suburb of Rajakilpakkam between Velachery and Tambaram, it comes under Sembakkam Municipality situated on the outskirts of Chennai, India. The mosque was constructed by Nawab Zulfiqar Khan, an officer in the Mughal army in 1703.

References 
 

Mosques in Tamil Nadu
Mosques completed in 1703
1703 establishments in Asia
Buildings and structures in Kanchipuram district